Nicholas Edward Goulish (November 3, 1916 - May 15, 1984) was a Major League Baseball outfielder. He only played two games in the outfield, while appearing in eleven games as a pinch hitter and one as a pinch runner.

Sources

Major League Baseball outfielders
Philadelphia Phillies players
Greensburg Green Sox players
Beaver Falls Bees players
Hamilton Red Wings (baseball) players
Utica Blue Sox players
Portland Beavers players
Baseball players from Pennsylvania
1916 births
1984 deaths